Before Midnight is a 1925 American silent drama film directed by John G. Adolfi and starring William Russell, Barbara Bedford and Brinsley Shaw.

Cast
 William Russell as Tom Galloway 
 Barbara Bedford as Helen Saldivar 
 Brinsley Shaw as Dobbs, valet 
 Alan Roscoe as J. Dallas Durand 
 Rex Lease as Julio Saldivar

References

Bibliography
 Munden, Kenneth White. The American Film Institute Catalog of Motion Pictures Produced in the United States, Part 1. University of California Press, 1997.

External links
 

1925 films
1925 drama films
1920s English-language films
American silent feature films
Silent American drama films
American black-and-white films
Films directed by John G. Adolfi
1920s American films